The Battle of Fort Titus was a battle that occurred during  conflicts in the Kansas Territory between abolitionist and pro-slavery militias prior to the American Civil War. The era is known as Bleeding Kansas.

Background 
Fort Titus was built about April 1856 to be the fortress home of Henry T. Titus, a colonel in the militia of the Southern-oriented of the two governments of Kansas Territory. It was said Titus squatted on the claim of a free-state settler while he was away and built his cabin on this land. Fort Titus was a fortified log cabin with gun loopholes built into its walls to allow it to be defended from the inside. This fort had at least one window and it had a small log addition on the north side that served as a kitchen.

In August 1856 Camp Sacket, a U.S. Army post, was about a mile away from Fort Titus. Camp Sacket was established to provide some aid to the pro-slavery government of the Kansas Territory, in Lecompton. The Territorial  government was sympathetic to the expansion of slavery into Kansas. In January 1856, to counter those sympathetic to the expansion of slavery, Free-State advocates illegally elected Charles L. Robinson as Territorial Governor of Kansas under the Topeka Constitution. Robinson's government was not recognized by the Federal government. From the spring of 1856 until September, Robinson and several other free-state leaders, including the son of abolitionist John Brown, were held in custody in Camp Sackett. The troops at Camp Sacket were supplied by Fort Leavenworth and did their best to maintain a neutral stance between the two sides. Both sides accused the Army of favoring the opposing side.

Some distance south of Fort Titus was another pro-slavery partisan stronghold known as Fort Saunders. When Fort Saunders came under attack and was destroyed by free-state partisans on August 15, 1856, pro-slavery partisans sought revenge. Since it was known that free-state men at times garrisoned in another nearby fortified residence, known as Judge Wakefield's house, this became the focus of retaliation for the destruction of Fort Saunders. At 2 A.M. on August 16 pro-slavery partisans, including Henry T. Titus, attacked Wakefield's fortress home, but they were unable to take it. Later that day free-state men retaliated against Titus, and attacked and destroyed Titus' fortress home.

Battle 
About 400 free-staters under the command of Samuel Walker attacked Fort Titus. Titus had a force of at least twenty-one men, including thirteen German stonemasons from nearby Lecompton, Kansas, with him. The attack was launched before a brass cannon had arrived on the site. This attempt was unsuccessful and the leader of this first attack was killed. Apparently some of the men from this attack placed themselves between Lecompton and the Army troops, so no messages could be sent between Wilson Shannon, the governor, and the troops.

Once the cannon arrived the battle ended quickly, since the fort's walls were no match for the cannonballs, which passed entirely through the fort. This cannon, named Old Sacramento, had changed hands between the Northern and Southern partisans three times prior to this battle. The cannonballs were made from type from a Lawrence newspaper. The battle probably lasted no more than thirty minutes. The Camp Sacket commander, Maj. John Sedgwick, moved toward Fort Titus to stop the battle, but it was over before troops arrived.

As soon as the battle was finished, the prisoners were taken to Lawrence and Fort Titus was burned, never to be rebuilt.

Aftermath 

A correspondent for The New York Times wrote the following, dated Lawrence, Sunday, August 17, 1856, after the battle:

The Southern partisans sought retaliation for their string of defeats in August, when not only Fort Titus, but New Georgia's fort, Franklin's Fort, and Fort Saunders were all taken by free-state partisans. On the night of September 1, 1856, the Southerners burned six houses and one other building, including Judge Wakefield's house. The Wakefield family lost all their possessions.

See also
 List of battles fought in Kansas

Notes

External links
  Historic Lecompton with Fort Titus replica

1856 riots
1856 in the United States
Bleeding Kansas
August 1856 events
1856 in Kansas Territory